Rutecarpine or rutaecarpine is a COX-2 inhibitor isolated from Tetradium ruticarpum. It is classified as a non-basic alkaloid.

In contrast to synthetic COX-2 inhibitors like etoricoxib and celecoxib, rutecarpine does not appear to cause negative effects on the cardiovascular system; in fact, it compensates for the adverse effects usually caused by COX-2 inhibition.

Metabolism 

Microsome studies suggest that rutaecarpine may be at least a weak inhibitor of CYP1A2, CYP2C9, CYP2C19, CYP2E1, and CYP3A4 enzymes. At the same time, it is believed to be a strong inducer of CYP1A2 and CYP1A1.

Rutecarpine metabolism is complex and proceeds along several routes, primarily involving the addition of a single hydroxyl group by CYP3A4. Six monohydroxylated and four dihydroxylated metabolites have been identified. To a much lesser extent, rutecarpine may be metabolized by CYP2C9 and CYP1A2, according to liver microsome studies.

Supplementation 
Rutecarpine has been shown to decrease the overall bioavailability of caffeine in rats by up to 80 percent, likely through induction of enzymes CYP1A2 and CYP2E1. For this reason, rutecarpine is marketed online as a "decaffeinator." However, the long-term safety of rutecarpine supplementation has not been established.

References

COX-2 inhibitors
Indole alkaloids
Heterocyclic compounds with 5 rings